"Our Song" is a song from Goodnight Nurse's debut studio album, Always and Never. It was released in 2005 as the fourth single from the album. It is their strongest charting single to date, peaking at number fifteen on the RIANZ charts in New Zealand. 

The single featured a rock cover of "Milkshake" by Kelis.

During Big Day Out 2007 and at numerous other performances, Goodnight Nurse mentioned "Our Song" was written about the lead singer's deceased grandfather.

Track listings
"Our Song" - 3:52
"Milkshake" - 2:28

Charts

References

2005 singles
Goodnight Nurse songs

Songs written by Joel Little
2005 songs